The Crucial Test is a lost 1916 American silent drama film directed by John Ince and Robert Thornby. It stars Kitty Gordon and was distributed by the World Film Corporation.

Cast
Kitty Gordon as Thanya
Niles Welch as Vance Holden
J. Herbert Frank as Grand Duke Alexander Bagroff
William W. Cohill as Boris
Winifred Harris as Princess
Adolphe Menjou as Count Nicolai

References

External links

1916 films
American silent feature films
Lost American films
Films directed by John Ince
Films directed by Robert Thornby
American black-and-white films
Silent American drama films
1916 drama films
World Film Company films
1916 lost films
Lost drama films
1910s American films
1910s English-language films